The 2021 Junior Pan American Artistic Gymnastics Championships was held in Guadalajara, Mexico, June 18–20, 2021.

Medal summary

Medal table

References

2021 in gymnastics
Pan American Gymnastics Championships
International gymnastics competitions hosted by Mexico
Pan American Artistic Gymnastics Championships
Pan American Artistic Gymnastics Championships